Firestation No. 8 is a historic building in northeastern Salt Lake City, Utah, United States, that is located within the University Neighborhood Historic District, but is individually listed on the National Register of Historic Places (NRHP).

Description
The former fire station, located at 258 South 1300 East, was built in 1930. When listed, it was then the second oldest relatively intact fire station in Salt Lake City, after No. 3, built in 1914.  The station was built in 1930 to serve the east bench area.  It was designed to be compatible with the residential neighborhood, and has elements of English Cottage styling.

The station was operational until 1980, although used only by paramedics in the later years, because the doorways could not handle large modern firetrucks. It later served as a restaurant.

The building was listed on the NRHP July 28, 1983. Over a decade later it was also included as a contributing building in the University Neighborhood Historic District, NRHP-listed in 1995.

See also

 National Register of Historic Places listings in Salt Lake City

References

External links

Fire stations in Utah
National Register of Historic Places in Salt Lake City

Buildings and structures completed in 1930
1930 establishments in Utah